Hafiz or Hafez ("one who remembers"  "keeper") is an Arabic name.

Notable people with the name include:

Mononym
 Hafez or Khwajeh Shams al-Din Muhammad Hafez-e Shirazi, a 14th-century Persian mystic and poet. Sometimes credited as "Hafiz" or "Hafiz of Shiraz"
 Abdul Hafiz (VC) (1918–1944), British Indian Army officer and Victoria Cross recipient 
 Abdul Hafiz (Guantanamo detainee 1030) (self-identifies as Abdul Qawi)
 Hafiz al-Iraqi (1325–1403), Islamic scholar

Given name

Hafez
 Hafez al-Assad (1930–2000), president of Syria 1971–2000
 Hafez Ibrahim (1871–1932), also referred to as Hafiz or Hafez, Egyptian poet of the early 20th century
 Hafëz Jusuf Azemi, Balli Kombëtar fighter from the Dobrošte unit. After World War II, forced into exile in the United States
 Hafez Kasseb, Egyptian footballer 
 Hafez Makhlouf (born 1971), Syrian intelligence officer who was head of the internal branch of the General Security
 Hafiz Muhammad Saeed (born 1950), Pakistani Islamist militant, co-founder of Lashkar-e-Taiba (LeT) and the chief of Jama'at-ud-Da'wah (JuD), UN-designated terrorist organisations operating mainly from Pakistan
 Hafez Al Mirazi, Egyptian journalist 
 Hafez Nazeri, Iranian-Kurdish composer

Hafiz
 Hafiz (Malaysian singer) (born 1990), winner of the seventh season of Akademi Fantasia
 Al-Hafiz (d. 1149), the eleventh Caliph of the Fatimids
 Hafiz Ali Khan (1888–1972), Indian sarod player 
 Hafiz Alpuri, sufi Pashto poet 
 Hafiz Hakki (1879–1915), Ottoman general 
 Hafiz Hashim, Malaysian badminton player, full name Muhammad Hafiz Hashim  
 Hafiz Khan, Fijian businessman and politician 
 Hafiz Muhammad Saeed, Pakistani professor 
 Hafiz Rahim (1983–2020), Singaporean footballer
 Hafiz Rahmat Khan (1708/9–1774), ruler and warrior in North India 
 Hafiz Siddiqi (1931–2018), Bangladeshi academic

Hafız
 Hafız Selman İzbeli, Turkish militiawoman

Surname

Hafez
 Abdel Halim Hafez (1929–1977), Egyptian singer and actor
 Bahiga Hafez (1901–1983), Egyptian screenwriter, composer, director, editor, producer and actress
 Nada Hafez (born 1997), Egyptian sabre fencer
 Farid Hafez (born 1981), Austrian political scientist
 Karim Hafez (born 1996), Egyptian footballer
 Mohammed Hafez, specialist in Islamist movements, political militancy and violent radicalization
 Mohamed Ali Hafez, administrator with the Egyptian Federation for Scouts and Girl Guides served on the World Scout Committee of the World Organization
 Nevine Hafez (born 1968), Egyptian swimmer
 Randa Hafez (born 1985), Egyptian pop singer 
 Salah al-Deen Hafez (1938–2008), Egyptian writer and journalist
 Sherwite Hafez (born 1967), Egyptian swimmer
 Sulayman Hafez, Egyptian lawyer and politician
 Suleiman Hafez (born 1941), Jordanian economist and politician
 Yasser Abdel Hafez (born 1969), Egyptian novelist and journalist

Hafiz
 Helal Hafiz, Bangladeshi poet
 Hisham Hafiz (1931–2006), Saudi Arabian author and newspaper publisher
 Mirza Ghulam Hafiz (1920–2000), Bangladeshi politician 
 Nezam Hafiz (1969–2001), Guyanese-American first class cricketer

Al Hafez / Al Hafiz
Amin al-Hafez (Lebanon) (1926–2009), Lebanese politician, former Prime Minister of Lebanon
Amin al-Hafiz (or Amin Hafez; 1921–2009), Syrian politician, General and member of the Ba'ath Party who served as the President of Syria from 27 July 1963 to 23 February 1966

Names of God in Islam